Abdelmoumen Sifour (born March 3, 1998) is an Algerian footballer who plays as a goalkeeper for RC Arbaâ in the Algerian Ligue Professionnelle 1, on loan from USM Alger.

Club career
In 2019, Abdelmoumen Sifour was promoted to USM Alger's first team.

References

External links
 

1998 births
People from Algiers
Algerian footballers
Living people
Association football goalkeepers
USM Alger players
21st-century Algerian people